Boston Lyceum may refer to:

in Boston, Massachusetts
 Boston Lyceum for the Education of Young Ladies (est. 1811), school overseen by John Park
 Boston Lyceum periodical, ca.1827
 Boston Lyceum (est. 1829), civic association for popular education, lectures, debates, etc.
 Boston Lyceum, a theatre on Sudbury Street, [ca.1848-1851?]
 Boston Lyceum Bureau (est. 1868), commercial booking agency for lecturers and performers
 Lyceum Theatre, Washington Street, [ca.1890s-1900s?]
 Boston Lyceum School, [ca.1910s-1930s?]

Disambiguation pages